Law Hiu Fung (born 13 November 1983) is a rower from Hong Kong who competed at the 2004 and 2008 Olympic Games in the men's single sculls. He was the closing ceremony flag bearer of Hong Kong at the Beijing Olympic Games.

References

Hong Kong male rowers
Olympic rowers of Hong Kong
Rowers at the 2004 Summer Olympics
Rowers at the 2008 Summer Olympics
Living people
Asian Games medalists in rowing
Rowers at the 2002 Asian Games
Rowers at the 2006 Asian Games
Rowers at the 2010 Asian Games
Rowers at the 2014 Asian Games
Asian Games silver medalists for Hong Kong
Asian Games bronze medalists for Hong Kong
Medalists at the 2002 Asian Games
Year of birth missing (living people)
21st-century Hong Kong people